Patriots' Day (Patriot's Day in Maine) is an annual event, formalized as a legal holiday or a special observance day in six states, commemorating the battles of Lexington, Concord, and Menotomy, some of the first battles of the American Revolutionary War. The holiday occurs on the third Monday of April each year, with celebrations including battle reenactments and the Boston Marathon.

History
In 1894, the Lexington Historical Society petitioned the Massachusetts General Court to proclaim April 19 as "Lexington Day". Concord countered with "Concord Day". However, the biggest battle fought on this day was in the town of Menotomy—now Arlington, Massachusetts—on the Concord Road between Lexington and Concord and Boston. So Governor Frederic T. Greenhalge opted for a compromise: Patriots' Day. 
  
Patriots' Day was proclaimed in Massachusetts in 1894 by Gov. Greenhalge, replacing Fast Day as a public holiday. The idea was introduced to the Governor by the statesman from Lowell, Isaac Henry Paige.  It was established on April 19, commemorating the date of the Battles of Lexington and Concord and the larger Battle of Menotomy in 1775, and consolidating the longstanding municipal observances of Lexington Day and Concord Day. It also marked the first bloodshed of the American Civil War in the Baltimore riot of 1861. The dual commemoration, Greenhalge explained, celebrated "the anniversary of the birth of liberty and union".  It is likely that the battles that took place in Menotomy are not as well known as the smaller battles in Lexington and Concord because the town has had several names since that day in 1775. In 1938, with the generation that had fought in the Civil War largely off the voter rolls, the Massachusetts legislature passed a bill establishing the holiday "in commemoration of the opening events of the War of the Revolution".

Maine followed Massachusetts in 1907 and replaced its Fast Day with Patriot's Day.
On June 10, 2017, Governor Dannel Malloy signed a bill establishing Patriots' Day as a statewide unpaid holiday in Connecticut, and on April 16, 2018, Connecticut became the fifth state to recognize the holiday. On March 19, 2019, Governor Doug Burgum signed a bill recognizing Patriots' Day in the state of North Dakota.

Description
The holiday was originally celebrated on April 19, the actual anniversary of the battles (fought in 1775). Since 1969, it has been observed on the third Monday in April in Massachusetts and in Maine (which until the Missouri Compromise of 1820 was part of Massachusetts).  The Monday holiday creates a three-day long weekend. It is also the first day of a vacation week for public schools in both states and a school holiday for many local colleges and universities, both public and private.

The day is a public school observance day in Wisconsin. Florida law also encourages people to celebrate it, though it is not treated as a legal holiday. Connecticut began observance in 2018 and North Dakota in 2019.

Observances and re-enactments of the battles occur annually at Lexington Green in Lexington, Massachusetts (around 6:00 am) and the Old North Bridge in Concord, Massachusetts (around 9:00 am) and in Arlington, Massachusetts on the Sunday before Patriot's Day. Tours are available of the Jason Russell House in Arlington, Massachusetts on Sunday and Monday. On Monday morning, mounted re-enactors with state police escorts retrace the Midnight Rides of Paul Revere and William Dawes, calling out warnings the whole way.

The most significant celebration of Patriots' Day is the Boston Marathon, which has been run every Patriots' Day since April 19, 1897 (except in 2020 and 2021) to mark the then-recently established holiday, with the race linking the Athenian and American struggles for liberty.

Sporting events
The Boston Marathon has been run on Patriots' Day every year since its inception in 1897, even during the World War years, except in 2020 and 2021. Therefore, sometimes the holiday is referred to as "Marathon Monday". However, due to the COVID-19 pandemic, the 2020 Boston Marathon was canceled, while the 2021 Boston Marathon was rescheduled to October 11.

The Boston Red Sox have been scheduled to play at home in Fenway Park on Patriots' Day every year since 1959. The game was postponed due to weather in 1959, 1961, 1965, 1967, 1984, and 2018. It was canceled in 1995 due to the baseball strike, and again in 2020 due to COVID-19. The game was played in 2013 despite the Boston Marathon bombing because it had finished before the bombs went off. From 1968 to 2006 the games started early, in the morning, around 11:00 am. The early start to these games usually resulted in the games' ending just as the runners headed through Kenmore Square. However, since 2007 the marathon has started between 9:30 am and 10:00 am, causing the racers to pass through Kenmore closer to the middle of the Red Sox game.

See also

 Bunker Hill Day
 Evacuation Day (Massachusetts)
 Minor American Revolution holidays
 Holidays of the United States

References

External links

 Patriots' Day information, via noblenet.org
 Information about Battle Reenactments, via battleroad.org
 The Battle of Menotomy via The Arlington Historical Society
 The Battle of Menotomy via historynet.com
 Massachusetts General Laws ch. 6, § 12
 The Wisconsin Statutes & Annotations General School Operations, Special observance day
 Maine Statutes Rev. 9-B, § 145

1894 establishments in Massachusetts
Recurring events established in 1894
Holidays related to the American Revolution
Massachusetts culture
April observances
State holidays in the United States
Holidays and observances by scheduling (nth weekday of the month)
Boston Marathon